La Rosière is a ski resort in southeastern France.

It was developed in the early 1950s on the site of an old hamlet, and was linked with the nearby Italian resort of La Thuile in 1984 via two fairly long drag lifts through the Little St Bernard Pass.

The ski area of l'Espace San Bernardo (which includes La Thuile) caters for all abilities: as of early 2008, it provides 8 green and 25 blue slopes for beginners, and 35 red and 14 black runs for the more advanced skiers.

A notable feature on the higher pistes is the Redoute Ruinée, a border fort built by France in the early 1890s after the loss of Alsace and Lorraine to Germany in 1870, as part of a general strengthening of the borders. It was heavily reinforced between 1936 and 1940 as part of the Alpine Line, in anticipation of invasion from Italy. In June 1940, during the Battle of France at the start of World War II, a small force of 47 men resisted several attacks from Italy, before being allowed to leave with the flag after the Armistice with Germany. The fort suffered heavy damage when French forces attempted to retake it towards the end of the war. It is now ruined, and public access to the interior is prohibited for safety reasons.

Hannibal is thought to have marched his elephants through this area on his passage through the Alps.

French actor Gaspard Ulliel was critically injured during a skiing incident at the resort on 18 January 2022, and died from his injuries in hospital the following day.

References

External links
Tourist Link
The La Roseire webcam

Ski areas and resorts in France
Tourist attractions in Savoie
Auvergne-Rhône-Alpes region articles needing translation from French Wikipedia